Hubert Schösser (born 11 November 1966 in Innsbruck) is an Austrian bobsledder who competed in the mid-1990s. He won two silver medals in the four-man event at the FIBT World Championships, earning them in 1993 and 1995.

Competing in two Winter Olympics, Schösser earned his best finish of fourth in the four-man event at Lillehammer in 1994.

He won the four-man Bobsleigh World Cup championship in 1993-4.

References
Bobsleigh four-man world championship medalists since 1930
Austrian Olympic Committee results for bobsleigh 
List of combined men's bobsleigh World Cup champions: 1985-2007
List of four-man bobsleigh World Cup champions since 1985
List of two-man bobsleigh World Cup champions since 1985

1966 births
Austrian male bobsledders
Bobsledders at the 1994 Winter Olympics
Bobsledders at the 1998 Winter Olympics
Living people
Olympic bobsledders of Austria